Società Cattolica di Assicurazione – Società Cooperativa known as Cattolica Assicurazioni is an Italian insurance company. According to Ricerche e Studi, a subsidiary of Mediobanca, the group had €5,382,471,000 (in 2014 financial year) gross premiums written making it the 6th largest Italian insurance company, or the fifth excluding Allianz, a subsidiary of the German insurer. Research by ANIA, showed the insurer as being ranked 5th by market share in non-life insurance (5.63%), but not in the top 5 in life insurance.

The company is a component of FTSE Italia Mid Cap Index. The company has been listed on Borsa Italiana since November 2000.

History
Cattolica Assicurazioni was actively in bancassurance, in which the insurer sold its products in banks. The insurer also bought part of the stake in the bank as part of the deal. Cattolica was a minority owner of Bancaperta (sold in 2002), Credito Artigiano (sold in 2002), Banca Mediterranea (sold in 2004), Banca di Cividale (sold in 2006), Banca di Valle Camonica (sold in 2015), Cassa di Risparmio di Fabriano e Cupramontana, Banca Lombarda e Piemontese, Banca Regionale Europea, Credito Bergamasco, Banca Popolare Sant'Angelo and Banca Popolare di Intra.

In 2000, Cattolica signed an agreement with Banca Popolare Sant'Angelo for bancassurance. In March 2002 the 6-year partnership with Credito Valtellinese (Creval) was terminated. Cattolica sold 5.56% stake of Bancaperta and 5% stake of Credito Artigiano to Creval, acquiring 5% stake of Risparmio & Previdenza and cash in return.

In 2002 Cattolica sold a minority stake in Credito Bergamasco (and Creberg SIM) to Banco Popolare di Verona e Novara (BPVN) for €57.1 million, acquiring 20% stake of Duomo Previdenza and 20% stake of Duomo Assicurazioni at the same time, for €55.7 million. The bancassurance agreement with former Banca Popolare di Verona was also renewed (BPV Vita). In 2004 more shares of Creberg were sold to BPVN, for €72,049,404. In 2007 Banco Popolare bought back BPV Vita (became Popolare Vita) for €64.18 million, but re-selling the 50% stake to Fondiaria-Sai.

In 2002 Cattolica bought 50% stake in Eurosun Assicurazioni Vita (Eurosav) for €15 million, forming a joint venture with Banca Popolare di Bari in bancassurance. In 2004 Cattolica bought an additional 15% stake of Risparmio & Previdenza from Banco di Sardegna for €8,175,000. Risparmio & Previdenza was a subsidiary of Cattolica, serving Cassa di Risparmio di Fabriano e Cupramontana and Banca di Credito Popolare di Torre del Greco. In the same year another 50% stake of Eurosav was bought for €40 million. Eurosav was absorbed by Risparmio & Previdenza in 2006; the businesses of Risparmio & Previdenza were absorbed by Cattolica Previdenza (pension fund only) and by the parent company on 31 December 2013 and by Cattolica Immobiliare on 1 June 2014.

In 2007 Cattolica signed a memorandum of understanding with Banca Popolare di Vicenza (BPVi) for bancassurance. Cattolica acquired 50% stake of Berica Vita and Vicenza Life (later Cattolica Life), as well as selling 50% stake of ABC Assicura to BPVi. Cattolica's subsidiary, Verona Gestioni SGR, was also merged with BPVi Fondi SGR, forming a joint venture in asset management. BPVi also acquired a minority stake in Cattolica. (15.07% as at 31 December 2015)

The bancassurance partnership with UBI Banca (ex-Banca Lombarda e Piemontese member banks only) was renewed in 2010, with Cattolica acquiring an additional 9.9% stake in Lombarda Vita from the banking group for about €120 million.

In 2013 Cattolica acquired FATA Assicurazioni Danni from Generali Italia, a subsidiary of Assicurazioni Generali for €179 million. On 5 April 2016 it was announced that the subsidiary would be absorbed by the parent company.

On 4 August 2016 Cattolica terminated the partnership with BPVi.

Competitors 
Among the competitors of the Cattolica Assicurazioni Group, in the Italian insurance market there are Generali Group and Unipol Group, both listed on Borsa Italiana and, among unlisted companies, Vittoria Assicurazioni and Reale Mutua.

Subsidiaries
 BCC Assicurazioni (51%, joint venture with ICCREA Banca)
 BCC Vita (51%, joint venture with ICCREA Banca)
 Lombarda Vita (60%, joint venture with UBI Banca)
 TUA Assicurazioni

Equity interests
 UBI Banca (0.57%)
 Banca Popolare di Vicenza (0.0006%)
 Veneto Banca (0.22%)
 Cassa di Risparmio di San Miniato (25.12%)
 Emilbanca (0.08%)

Shareholders

 Banca Popolare di Vicenza (15.07%)
 Norges Bank (2.086%)
 Palladio Finanziaria (2.044%)
 Fondazione Banca del Monte di Lombardia (2.043%)
 treasury shares (2.005%)

References

External links
  

Financial services companies established in 1896
1896 establishments in Italy
Insurance companies of Italy
Companies based in Verona
Cooperatives in Italy
Banca Popolare di Vicenza